Cole Sternberg is an American visual artist. Sternberg's works are chiefly in the medium of painting, but also photography, sculpture, room installations and film. His work initially came to public view with the release of Cole Sternberg Paintings, a publication chronicling six years of his painting, (many made during university, and the majority of which had never before been seen by the public). Since then, he has been featured extensively in exhibitions in the United States and Europe.

Early life 
Sternberg was born in Richmond, VA and grew up in Saratoga, CA. He spent his early life drawing endlessly, but hated the concept of being told how to perceive art, hence his educational pursuits led to B.A. degrees from Villanova University in business, and a Juris Doctor from American University. While at American, Sternberg received the university's Highest Award for Scholarship at the Graduate Level.  He hung oil paintings in a bar in his spare time as a student at American.

Career 
Cole Sternberg lives and works in Los Angeles.  His practice touches  a range of formats including painting, installation, video, and writing. Series of his work has focused on a variety of social issues, from current human rights activism and its relationship to the law, to the environment, to the media and concepts of content overload.

The works tend to be subtle or subversive in nature, driven by elegant visual concepts and poetry. He is interested in the intersection between humanity and humankind and how their lack of congruity hinders social progression and development.

Sternberg has exhibited both nationally and internationally, including exhibitions at The American University Museum (Washington, DC), El Segundo Museum of Art (El Segundo, CA), Hochhaus Hansa (a Ruhr.2010 Museum, Dortmund, Germany), Primary (Miami), David B. Smith Gallery (Denver), Los Angeles Nomadic Division (LAND, Los Angeles), the Getty Museum's Pacific Standard Time, Paris Photo (Los Angeles), Zona Maco (Mexico City), ArtBo (Bogota), Art Los Angeles Contemporary (ALAC), e105 Gallery (Berlin), LA><ART (Los Angeles) and MAMA (Los Angeles & Berlin).

His works are held by major collections throughout the world, such as the Los Angeles County Museum of Art (LACMA), Pérez Art Museum Miami (PAMM), El Segundo Museum of Art (ESMoA), American University Museum (AUM) and Deutsche Telekom. It has been featured in the New York Times, Wall Street Journal, 
Whitewall Magazine, Issue Magazine, Autre Magazine, Hercules, Denver Post, Miami New Times, LA Weekly, Art Ltd., Architectural Digest, Angeleno, Sleek, Metal Magazine, Flaunt, ArtNet, Huffington Post, Cool Hunting, Santa Barbara Magazine, Huffington Post, Lum Art Magazine, Carla and Elephant.

Exhibitions

2022 

 departed for the curve, Praz Delavallade, Los Angeles, CA
 to join the larger raindrop of the world, Yeo Workshop, Singapore
 The Medium as the Message, Wende Museum, Los Angeles, CA

2021 

 Threads and Tensions: The Interconnected World, Yeo Workshop, Singapore
 Freestate, El Segundo Museum of Art (ESMoA), El Segundo, CA

2020 

 Show Me the Signs, Blum & Poe, Los Angeles, CA
 Year One, Ojai Institute, Ojai, CA
 owls stirred the silence here and there, Pluto Projects, Los Angeles, CA

2019 

 The Edge of Light, Huntington Beach Art Center, Huntington Beach, CA
 Smoke & Mirrors, AF Projects, Los Angeles, CA
 the blue water was only a heavier and darker air, Peter Blake Gallery, Laguna Beach, CA 
 the trees turned to shadows in a grey fog, There-There, Los Angeles, CA

2018 

 A Matter of Course, The Guggenheim Gallery at Chapman University, Orange, CA
 As You Like It - C’est Comme Vous Voulez, Praz Delavallade, Los Angeles, CA

2017 

 the windward side off the island, MAMA, Berlin, Germany
 elsegundissimo, El Segundo Museum of Art, El Segundo, CA

2016 
 for a moment the concrete felt soft and warm, AiOP, New York, NY
 for a moment, it scraped, then cooled, the feet, LAXART, Los Angeles, CA
 Rob Pruitt's Flea Market, Los Angeles Nomadic Division (LAND), Los Angeles, CA
 the nature of breathing in salt, MAMA, Los Angeles, CA

2015 
 are the green fields gone, the high seas
 a moment near the sea, MAMA + ARTed House, East Hampton, NY

2014 
 Erection, MAMA, Los Angeles, CA
 International Friendship Exhibition, Primary, Miami, FL
 Home, El Segundo Museum of Art, El Segundo, CA

2013 
 Art Works, e105 Gallery, Berlin, Germany  
 a moment in the sun, ARTed House, Wainscott, NY
 all his strength was concentrated in his fists, including the very strength that held him upright, David B. Smith Gallery, Denver, CO

2012 
 you'll miss your riding lesson tomorrow, Primary Projects, Caruso Art and Flaunt Magazine, Miami, FL 
 Perpetual Conceptual: Echoes of Eugenia Butler, Los Angeles Nomadic Division (LAND), Los Angeles, CA  
 All in for the 99%, Ace Museum, Los Angeles, CA  
 Salon de Notre Societe, Primary Projects, Miami, FL  
 Group Exhibition, Deutsche Telekom (Detecon), Cologne, Germany</ref> 
 Group Exhibition, David B. Smith Gallery, Denver, CO

2011 
 Here Lies Georges Wildenstein, Primary Projects, Miami, FL 
 I was here for just a moment, David B. Smith Gallery, Denver, CO

2010 
 One on One, Hochhaus Hansa (a Ruhr.2010 Museum), Dortmund, Germany 
 100 Artists See Satan, Grand Central Arts Center, Cal State Fullerton, Santa Ana, CA 
 Group Exhibition, David B. Smith Gallery, Denver, CO
 Transparenz, Detecon (presented by e105 Gallery), Bonn, Germany

2009 
 and those who were dancing were thought to be insane by those who could not hear the music, American University Museum, Washington, DC
 New Works, Kinsey/DesForges, Culver City, CA

Publications 
 the constitution, the free republic of california, 2021
 my first summer in the sierra, words by John Muir, imagery and design by Cole Sternberg, hat & beard press, 2021
 the nature of breathing in salt, hat & beard press, 2019
the windward side of the island, 2017
 for a moment it scraped then cooled the skin, 2016
 all his strength was concentrated in his fists, including the very strength that held him upright, 2013
 And those who were dancing were thought to be insane by those who could not hear the music, 2010, Chronicling the exhibition of the same name at the American University Museum
 Cole Sternberg Paintings, 2008, Chronicling on canvas works from 2002–2008

Interviews and other media 
Meet the Artist: Cole Sternberg, Elle Magazine
California Dreamin' An Interview with Cole Sternberg on Conceiving the Free Republic of California, Autre Magazine
Cole Sternberg at the El Segundo Museum of Art (ESMoA), CARLA 
The Free Republic of California - An Interview with Cole Sternberg, Compound-Ed 
 Year One - The Free Republic of California at CGBF, Lum Art Magazine
Where Freedom Reigns, Santa Barbara Magazine 
 Books that belong on everyone's wish list, LA Weekly
The Free Republic of California was just created in El Segundo, LA Weekly
Freestate at El Segundo Museum of Art imagines 'The Free Republic of California, KCRW 
An Interview with Cole Sternberg, Huffington Post
Cole Sternberg, Issue Magazine
 Cole Sternberg and the Link between Painting and the Environment, Sleek Magazine
 Cole Sternberg, the Sky, the Ocean and Everything in Between, Metal Magazine
 Live Long Enough to Live Forever: A Q & Awith Cole Sternberg, Autre Magazine
 5 Questions with Cole Sternberg, Elephant Magazine
 Bi-Coastal: Cole Sternberg, The Excellent People
 New York Artist Portfolio, Hercules Magazine
 Candy Apple Grey Paint, Flaunt Magazine
 5 Booths to Check out at this Year’s Art Los Angeles Contemporary Fair, ArtNet
 Artist Cole Sternberg’s Boat Voyage from Japan to Portland, Cool Hunting
 An Interview with Cole Sternberg, Berlin Art Link
 A Moment in the Sun, Whitewall Magazine
 The Distinct Californication of Paris Photo L.A., New York Times, T Magazine
 Cars as Canvas; Walls as Artwork, Wall Street Journal
Cole Sternberg: The Content is Bleeding Through

References

External links 
 Cole Sternberg Website

American contemporary artists
Living people
Artists from Richmond, Virginia
Year of birth missing (living people)
Artists from the San Francisco Bay Area